In heterosexual sexual relationships, concepts of age disparity, including what defines an age disparity, have developed over time and vary among societies. Differences in age preferences for mates can stem from partner availability, gender roles, and evolutionary mating strategies, and age preferences in sexual partners may vary cross-culturally. There are also social theories for age differences in relationships as well as suggested reasons for 'alternative' age-hypogamous relationships. Age-disparate relationships have been documented for most of recorded history and have been regarded with a wide range of attitudes dependent on sociocultural norms and legal systems.

Statistics

Data in Australia and the United Kingdom show an almost identical pattern.

Relationships with age disparities have been observed with both men and women as the older or younger partner. In various cultures, older men and younger women often seek one another for sexual or marital relationships. Older women sometimes date younger men as well, and in both cases wealth and apparent physical attractiveness are often relevant. Because most men are interested in women in their 20s, adolescent boys are generally sexually interested in women somewhat older than they are. Older men also display an interest in women of their own age. However, research suggests that relationship patterns are more influenced by women's preferences than men's.

Most men marry women younger than they are; with the difference being between two and three years in Spain, the UK reporting the difference to be on average about three years, and the US, two and a half. The pattern was also confirmed for the rest of the world, with the gap being largest in Africa. However, the number of women marrying younger men is rising. A study released in 2003 by the UK's Office for National Statistics concluded that the proportion of women in England and Wales marrying younger men rose from 15% to 26% between 1963 and 1998. Another study also showed a higher divorce rate as the age difference rose for when either the woman was older or the man was older. A 2008 study, however, concluded that the difference is not significant.

In August 2010, Michael Dunn of the University of Wales Institute, Cardiff, completed and released the results of a study on age disparity in dating. Dunn concluded that "Not once across all ages and countries ... did females show a preference for males significantly younger than male preferences for females" and that there was a "consistent cross-cultural preference by women for at least same-age or significantly older men". A 2003 AARP study reported that 34% of women over 39 years old were dating younger men.

A 2011 study suggested that marriage of younger men by women is positively correlated with decreased longevity, particularly for the woman, though married individuals generally still have longer lifespans than singles.

Reasons for age disparity
There are complex and diverse reasons that people enter into age-disparate relationships, and a recent review in the Journal of Family Theory and Review showed vast differences across contexts. Explanations for age disparity usually focus on either the rational choice model or the analysis of demographic trends in a society. The rational choice model suggests that people look for partners who can provide for them in their life (bread-winners); as men earn more as they get older, women will therefore prefer older men. This factor is diminishing as more women enter the labor force. The demographic trends are concerned with the sex ratio in the society, the marriage squeeze, and migration patterns. Another explanation concerns cultural values: the higher the value placed in having children, the higher the age gap will be. Yet Canadian researchers have found that age-disparate couples are less likely to have children than similarly aged ones. As people have chosen to marry later and remarriage becomes more common, the age differences between couples have increased as well.

In a Brown University study, it has been noted that the social structure of a country determines the age difference between spouses more than any other factor. One of the concerns of relationships with age disparities in some cultures is a perceived difference between people of different age ranges. These differences may be sexual, financial or social. Gender roles may complicate this even further. Socially, a society with a difference in wealth distribution between older and younger people may affect the dynamics of the relationship.

Although the "cougar" trend, in which older women date much younger men, is often portrayed in the media as a widespread and established facet of modern Western culture, at least one academic study has found the concept to be a "myth". A British psychological study published in Evolution and Human Behavior in 2010 concluded that men and women, in general, continued to follow traditional gender roles when searching for mates. The study found that, as supported by other academic studies, most men preferred younger, "attractive" women, while most women, of any age, preferred successful, established men their age or older. The study found very few instances of older women pursuing much younger men and vice versa. The study has been criticized, however, for limiting their results to online dating profiles, which are traditionally not used by those seeking older or younger partners, and for excluding the United States from the study.

Evolutionary perspective

Evolutionary approach 
The evolutionary approach, based on the theories of Charles Darwin, attempts to explain age disparity in sexual relationships in terms of natural selection and sexual selection. Within sexual selection, Darwin identified a further two mechanisms which are important factors in the evolution of sex differences (sexual dimorphism): intrasexual selection (involves competition with those of the same sex over access to mates) and intersexual choice (discriminative choice of mating partners). Life history theory (that includes Parental Investment Theory) provides an explanation for the above mechanisms and strategies adopted by individuals, leading to age disparity in relationships. Life history theory posits that individuals have to divide energy and resources between activities (as energy and resources devoted to one task cannot be used for another task) and this is shaped by natural selection.

Parental Investment Theory refers to the value that is placed on a potential mate based on reproductive potential and reproductive investment. The theory predicts that preferred mate choices have evolved to focus on reproductive potential and reproductive investment of members of the opposite sex. This theory predicts both intrasexual selection and intersexual choice due to differences in parental investment; typically there is competition among members of the lower investing sex (generally males) over the parental investment of the higher investing sex (generally females) who will be more selective in their mate choice. However, human males tend to have more parental investment compared to mammal males (although females still tend to have more parental investment). Thus, both sexes will have to compete and be selective in mate choices. These two theories explain why natural and sexual selection acts slightly differently on the two sexes so that they display different preferences. For example, different age preferences may be a result of sex differences in mate values assigned to the opposite sex at those ages.

A study conducted by David Buss investigated heterosexual sex differences in mate preferences in 37 cultures with 10,047 participants. In all 37 cultures it was found that males preferred females younger than themselves and females preferred males older than themselves. These age preferences were confirmed in marriage records with males marrying females younger than them and vice versa. A more recent study has supported these findings, conducted by Schwarz and Hassebrauck. This study used 21,245 participants between 18 and 65 years of age who were not involved in a close relationship. As well as asking participants a number of questions on mate selection criteria, they also had to provide the oldest and youngest partner they would accept. It was found that for all ages males were willing to accept females that are slightly older than they are (on average 4.5 years older), but they accept females considerably younger than their own age (on average 10 years younger). Females demonstrate a complementary pattern, being willing to accept older males (on average 8 years older) and were also willing to accept males younger than themselves (on average 5 years younger). This is somewhat different to our close evolutionary relatives: chimpanzees. Male chimpanzees tend to prefer older females than younger and it is suggested that specific cues of female mate value are very different to humans.

Male preference for younger females 
Buss attributed the male preference for younger females to certain youthful cues. In females, relative youth and apparent physical attractiveness (which males valued more compared to females) demonstrated cues for fertility and high reproductive capacity. Buss stated the specific age preference of around 25 years implied that fertility was a stronger ultimate cause of mate preference than reproductive value as data suggested that fertility peaks in females around mid-20s. From a life history theory perspective, females that display these cues are judged to be more capable of reproductive investment. This notion of age preference due to peak fertility is supported by Kenrick, Keefe, Gabrielidis, and Cornelius's study, which found that although teenage males would accept a mate slightly younger than they are, there was a wider range of preference for ages above their own. Teenage males also report that their ideal mates would be several years older than they are.

Buss and Schmitt stress that although long-term mating relationships are common for humans, there are both short-term and long-term mating relationships. Buss and Schmitt provided a Sexual Strategies Theory that describes the two sexes as having evolved distinct psychological mechanisms that underlie the strategies for short- and long-term mating. This theory is directly relevant and compatible with those two already mentioned, Life History and Parental Investment. Males tend to appear oriented towards short-term mating (greater desire for short-term mates than women, prefer larger number of sexual partners, and take less time to consent to sexual intercourse) and this appears to solve a number of adaptive problems including using fewer resources to access a mate. Although there are a number of reproductive advantages to short-term mating, males still pursue long-term mates, and this is due to the possibility of monopolizing a female's lifetime reproductive resources. Consistent with findings, for both short-term and long-term mates, males prefer younger females (reproductively valuable).

Female preference for older males 
 As they are the higher-investing sex, females tend to be slightly more demanding when picking a mate (as predicted by parental investment theory). They also tend to have a more difficult task of evaluating a male's reproductive value accurately based on physical appearance, as age tends to have fewer constraints on a male's reproductive resources. Buss attributed the older age preference to older males displaying characteristics of high providing-capacity such as status and resources. In terms of short-term and long-term mating, females tend to be oriented towards long-term mating due to the costs incurred from short-term mating. Although some of these costs will be the same for males and females (risk of STIs and impairing long-term mate value), the costs for women will be more severe due to paternity uncertainty (cues of multiple mates will be disfavoured by males).

In contrast to above, in short-term mating, females will tend to favour males that demonstrate physical attractiveness, as this displays cues of "good genes". Cues of good genes tend to be typically associated with older males such as facial masculinity and cheek-bone prominence. Buss and Schmitt found similar female preferences for long-term mating which supports the notion that, for long-term relationships, females prefer cues of high resource capacity, one of which is age.

Dataclysm's study identified that women tend to find men approximately their own age most desirable, e.g. 21-year-old women found 23-year-old men most attractive.

Cross-cultural differences 
Cross-culturally, research has consistently supported the trend in which males prefer to mate with younger females, and females with older males. In a cross-cultural study that covered 37 countries, preferences for age differences were measured and research supported the theory that people prefer to marry close to the age when female fertility is at its highest (24–25 years). Analysing the results further, cross culturally, the average age females prefer to marry is 25.4 years old, and they prefer a mate 3.4 years older than themselves, therefore their preferred mate would be aged 28.8 years of age. Males however prefer to marry when they are 27.5 years old, and a female to be 2.7 years younger than themselves, yielding their preferred mate to be 24.8 years old. The results from the study therefore show that the mean preferred marriage age difference (3.04 years averaging male and female preferred age) corresponds very closely with the actual mean marriage age difference (2.99). The preferred age of females is 24.8 years and the actual average age females marry is 25.3 years old (and 28.2 for males) which actually falls directly on the age where females are most fertile, however, this assumes this people are having children immediately after marrying. Moreover, these patterns fit many proposed explanations for age differences: evolutionarily adapted mating preferences, socialisation, and gendered economic differences.

The United Nations Marriage Statistics Department measures the Singulate Mean Age Marriage (SMAM) difference, the difference in average age at first marriage between men and women, across the main regions in the world (refer to Table. 1).

Larger than average age-gaps 

However, in some regions of the world there is a substantially larger age gap between marriage partners in that males are much older than their wife (or wives) or women are much younger than their husband (or husbands). A theory that can explain this finding from an evolutionary perspective is the parasite-stress theory which explains that an increase of infectious disease can cause humans to evolve selectively according to these pressures. Evidence also shows that as disease risk gets higher, it puts a level of stress on mating selection and increases the use of polygamy.

Table 2 shows that 17 of the 20 countries with the largest age-gaps between spouses practice polygyny, and that males range from 6.1 to 9.2 years older than their partners. In regions such as Sub-Saharan Africa the use of polygyny is commonly practiced as a consequence of high sex-ratios (more males per 100 females) and passing on heterozygous (diverse) genetics from different females to offspring. When disease is prevalent, if a male is producing offspring with a more diverse range of alleles, offspring will be more likely to withstand mortality from disease and continue the family line. Another reason that polygynous communities have larger age-gaps between spouses is that intrasexual competition for females increases as fewer females remain on the marriage market (with males having more than one wife each), therefore the competitive advantage values younger females due to their higher reproductive value. As the competition for younger women becomes more common, the age in females' first marriage lower as older men seek younger and younger females.

Smaller than average age-gaps 
In Western societies such as the US and Europe, there is a trend of smaller age-gaps between spouses, reaching its peak average in Southern Europe of 3.3 years. Using the same pathogen-stress model, there is a lower prevalence of disease in these economically developed areas, and therefore a reduced stress on reproduction for survival. Additionally, it is common to see monogamous relationships widely in more modern societies as there are more women in the marriage market and polygamy is illegal throughout most of Europe and the United States.

As access to education increases worldwide, the age of marriage increases with it, with more of the youth staying in education for longer. The mean age of marriage in Europe is well above 25, and averaging at 30 in Nordic countries, however this may also be due to the increase of cohabitation in European countries. In some countries in Europe such as France, Netherlands, United Kingdom, Norway, Estonia, Finland and Denmark, 20–30% of women aged 20–34 are cohabiting as opposed to legally marrying. In addition to this with the gender pay gap decreasing, more women work equal hours (average of 40 hours in Europe and the US) to males and look less for males with financial resources.

In regions such as the Caribbean and Latin America there is a lower SMAM difference than expected; however, there are also a large proportion of partners living in consensual unions; 24% in Brazil, 20% in Nicaragua and 18% in Dominican Republic.

A 2011 study suggested that age disparity in marriage is positively correlated with decreased longevity, particularly for women, though married people still have longer lifespans than singles.

Social perspectives

Social structural origin theory 
Social structural origin theory argues that the underlying cause of sex-differentiated behaviour is the concentration of men and women in differing roles in society. It has been argued that a reason gender roles are so prevalent in society is that the expectations of gender roles can become internalised in a person's self-concept and personality. In a Brown University study, it has been noted that the social structure of a country determines the age difference between spouses more than any other factor, challenging evolutionary explanations. In regard to mate selection, social structural theory supports the idea that individuals aim to maximise what they can provide in the relationship in an environment that is limiting their utilities through expected gender roles in society and marriage.

It is thought that a trade-off or equilibrium is reached, in regard to what each gender brings to the mating partnership, and that this equilibrium is most likely to be reached with a trade-off of ages when selecting a mate. Women trade youth and physical attractiveness for economic security in their male partner. This economic approach to choosing a partner ultimately depends on the marital or family system that is adopted by society. Women and men tend to seek a partner that will fit in with their society's sexual division of labour. For example, a marital system based on males being the provider and females the domestic worker, favours an age gap in the relationship. An older male is more likely to have more resources to provide to the family.

The rational choice model 
The rational choice model also suggests that people look for partners who can provide for them in their life (bread-winners); as men traditionally earn more as they get older, women will therefore prefer older men. This factor is diminishing as more women enter the labour force and the gender pay gap decreases.

Age-hypogamy in relationships 
Age-hypogamy defines a relationship where the woman is the older partner, the opposite of this being age-hypergamy. Marriage between partners of roughly similar age is known as "age homogamy".

Older female–younger male relationships are increasingly researched by social scientists. Slang terms such as "cougar" have been used in films, TV shows and the media to depict older females with younger male mates. The picture often displays a stereotypical pairing of a divorced, middle-aged, white, affluent female dating a younger male with the relationship taking the form of a non-commitment arrangement between the partners.

Although age-hypogamous relationships have historically been very infrequent, recent US census data has shown an increase in age-hypogamous relationships from 6.4% in 2000 to 7.7% in 2012.

There may be many reasons why age-hypogamous relationships have been less frequent until recently. Sexual double standards in society, in particular, may account for their rarity. In many contexts, ageing in women is seen to be associated with decreased sex appeal and dating potential.

There is debate in the literature as to what leads to age-hypogamy in sexual relationships. A number of variables have been argued to influence the likelihood of women entering into an age-hypogamous relationship, such as racial or ethnic background, level of education, income, marital status, conservatism, age, and number of sexual partners. For example, US Census data show an exaggerated sex ratio in African American communities, whereby there were 100 African American women for every 89 African American men. It was shown that African American women were more likely to be in age-hypogamous or age-hypergamous marriages in comparison with White American women. However, more recent evidence has found that women belonging to racial categories besides African American or White were more likely to sleep with younger men, showing that it is still unclear which, if any, ethnic groups are more likely to have age-hypogamous relationships.

Another example illustrating the varying literature surrounding age-hypogamous relationships is research indicating that a woman's marital status can influence her likelihood of engaging in age-hypogamous relationships. Married women are less likely to be partnered with younger men compared to non-married women. More recent findings suggest that previously married women are more likely to engage in an age-hypogamous sexual relationships compared to women who are married or who have never been married.

Despite social views depicting age-hypogamous relationships as short lived, a 2008 study from Psychology of Women Quarterly has found that women in age-hypogamous relationships are more satisfied and the most committed in their relationships compared to younger women or similarly aged partners. It has also been suggested that male partners engaging in age-hypogamous relationships are choosing beauty over age. A recent study found that when shown pictures of women of ages ranging from 20 to 45 with different levels of apparent attractiveness, regardless of age, men chose the more "attractive" individuals as long-term partners.

"Half-your-age-plus-seven" rule

An often-asserted rule of thumb to determine whether an age difference is socially acceptable holds that a person should never date someone whose age is less than half their own plus seven years. According to this rule, a 28-year-old would date no one younger than 21 (half of 28, plus 7) and a 50-year-old would date no one younger than 32 (half of 50, plus 7).

Although the provenance of the rule is unclear, it is sometimes said to have originated in France. The rule appears in John Fox Jr.'s 1903 novel The Little Shepherd of Kingdom Come, in American newspapers in 1931 attributed to Maurice Chevalier, and in The Autobiography of Malcolm X, attributed to Elijah Muhammad.

In earlier sources, the rule sometimes had a different interpretation than in contemporary times. Not only was it gender-specific, it was presented as a formula to calculate the ideal age of a female partner at the beginning of a relationship, instead of a lower limit. Frederick Locker-Lampson's Patchwork from 1879 states the opinion "A wife should be half the age of her husband with seven years added." Max O'Rell's Her Royal Highness Woman from 1901 gives the rule in the format "A man should marry a woman half his age, plus seven." A similar interpretation is also present in the 1951 play The Moon Is Blue by F. Hugh Herbert: "Haven't you ever heard that the girl is supposed to be half the man's age, plus seven?"

A 2000 study found that the rule was fairly accurate at predicting the minimum age of a woman that a man would marry or date. However, the rule was not found to be predictive of the minimum age of a man that a woman would marry or date, nor (by reversing the formula) of the maximum age that either sex would marry or date.

Slang terms 

Partner age disparities are typically met with some disdain in industrialized nations, and there are various derogatory terms for participants in these relationships.

In English-speaking countries, where financial disparity and an exchange of money for companionship is perceived as central to these relationships, the elder (presumably more wealthy) partner is often called a "sugar daddy" or "sugar mama", and the younger may be called a "sugar baby". In extreme cases, a person who marries a wealthy older partner – especially one in poor health – may be called a "gold digger".

An attractive younger woman pursued by a wealthy man who is perceived as wanting her only for her appearance or as a status symbol may be called a trophy wife. The opposite term, "trophy husband", does not have an agreed-upon use, but is becoming more common: some use the term to refer to the attractive stay-at-home husband of a much more famous man or woman; others use it to refer to the husband of a trophy wife, as he is her trophy due to his wealth and prestige. In the latter case, the term trophy is broadened to include any substantial difference in power originating from physical appearance, wealth, or status. The trophy label is often perceived as objectifying the partner, with or without the partner's implicit consent.

Where the primary perceived reason for a relationship with a significant age difference is sexual, many gender-specific terms have become popular in English-speaking cultures. A woman of middle to elderly age who pursues younger men is a cougar or puma, and a man in a relationship with an older woman is often called a boytoy, toyboy, himbo, gigolo, or cub. In reverse, the terms rhino, trout and manther (a play on the panther term for women) are generally used to label an older man pursuing younger women, and the younger woman in such a relationship may be called a kitten or panther. If the woman is extremely young, the man may be labelled a cradle-snatcher (UK) or cradle robber (US) In gay slang, the term chickenhawk may be used. If the much-younger target of affections is not of the legal age of consent or appears as such, the term jailbait may be applied to them, cautioning older partners against involvement. An older term for any licentious or lascivious man is a lecher. That term and its shortening, lech, have come to commonly describe an elderly man who makes passes at much younger women.

See also 

 Chronophilia
 Ephebophilia
 Homogamy (sociology) 
 Hypergamy
 Mate choice 
 Parental investment
 Polygamy
 Age and pregnancy
 Sexual selection in humans

References

Further reading 
 
 Berardo, F. M., Appel, J., & Berardo, D. H. (1993). Age dissimilar marriages: Review and assessment. Journal of Aging Studies, 7, 93–106. doi:10.1016/0890-4065(93)90026-G
Buss, D. M. (2015). The Handbook of Evolutionary Psychology, Foundation. New York: John Wiley & Sons.
 
 
McKenzie, Lara (2021). "Age-dissimilar couple relationships: 25 years in review". Journal of Family Theory and Review. 13 (4): 496–514. doi:10.1111/jftr.12427
Schwartz, C. R. (2013). "Trends and variation in assortative mating: Causes and consequences". Annual Review of Sociology, 39, 451–470. doi:10.1146/annurev-soc-071312-145544
 

Sexuality and age
Sex differences in humans
Ageism